Josh Thomas (born 17 April 1999) is an English professional footballer who plays as a midfielder for Gloucester City.

Club career
Thomas joined Cheltenham Town in 2013 from Hereford United and signed his first professional deal in May 2017. Prior to this, Thomas enjoyed a short-term loan spell at North Leigh towards the end of the 2016–17 campaign. Thomas went onto make his first-team debut for the Robins during their EFL Trophy tie against Swansea City U23s, which resulted in a 2–1 defeat for Cheltenham, with Thomas featuring for the entire 90 minutes.

On 1 September 2017, Thomas returned to North Leigh on loan until January 2018.

Career statistics

References

External links

1999 births
Living people
Sportspeople from Hereford
English footballers
Association football midfielders
Cheltenham Town F.C. players
North Leigh F.C. players
Gloucester City A.F.C. players
English Football League players
Southern Football League players
National League (English football) players
20th-century English people
21st-century English people